The 1995 Jacksonville State Gamecocks football team represented Jacksonville State University  as an independent during the 1995 NCAA Division I-AA football season.Led by 11th-year head coach Bill Burgess, the Gamecocks compiled a record of 7–4. Jacksonville State played home games at Paul Snow Stadium in Jacksonville, Alabama.

Schedule

References

Jacksonville State
Jacksonville State Gamecocks football seasons
Jacksonville State Gamecocks football